Khalil El-Maaoui (born September 12, 1988, Marsa, Tunis, Tunisia) is a Tunisian weightlifter. He qualified for the weightlifting event at the 2008 Summer Olympics (Men's 56 kg) and did not finish, and participated in the same event at the 2012 Summer Olympics but was also unable to finish.

References 

1988 births
Living people
Tunisian male weightlifters
Weightlifters at the 2008 Summer Olympics
Weightlifters at the 2012 Summer Olympics
Olympic weightlifters of Tunisia
People from Tunis
Mediterranean Games gold medalists for Tunisia
Mediterranean Games medalists in weightlifting
Competitors at the 2009 Mediterranean Games
Competitors at the 2013 Mediterranean Games
21st-century Tunisian people